In enzymology, a furylfuramide isomerase is an enzyme that catalyzes the chemical reaction

(E)-2-(2-furyl)-3-(5-nitro-2-furyl)acrylamide  (Z)-2-(2-furyl)-3-(5-nitro-2-furyl)acrylamide

Hence, this enzyme has one substrate, (E)-2-(2-furyl)-3-(5-nitro-2-furyl)acrylamide, and one product, (Z)-2-(2-furyl)-3-(5-nitro-2-furyl)acrylamide.

This enzyme belongs to the family of isomerases, specifically cis-trans isomerases.  The systematic name of this enzyme class is 2-(2-furyl)-3-(5-nitro-2-furyl)acrylamide cis-trans-isomerase. It has 2 cofactors: NAD+,  and NADH.

References

 

EC 5.2.1
NADH-dependent enzymes
Enzymes of unknown structure